Liu Shuzhen (born 7 March 1966) is a retired Chinese long jumper.

Her personal best jump was 6.92 metres, achieved in June 1990 in Beijing.

International competitions

References

1966 births
Living people
Chinese female long jumpers
Olympic athletes of China
Athletes (track and field) at the 1988 Summer Olympics
Athletes (track and field) at the 1992 Summer Olympics
Asian Games medalists in athletics (track and field)
Athletes (track and field) at the 1990 Asian Games
World Athletics Championships athletes for China
Asian Games silver medalists for China
Medalists at the 1990 Asian Games
20th-century Chinese women